The Anecdote is a full-length Azerbaijani film shot in Baku in 1989. Made in the tragic comedy genre, this film is about the dysfunctional Soviet management system in Azerbaijan SSR at the end of 1980s and about the decadence and corruption of the Soviet bureaucracy.

Reception

Cast
 Rasim Balayev - Rahimov
 Jeyhun Mirzayev - Mammadov
 Yashar Nuri - Mammad
 Mukhtar Maniyev - Kerimov
 Khuraman Hajıyeva - Khalilova
 Yelena Kostina - Alya
 Alexander Sharovski - Prosecutor
 Loghman Kerimov - The Deaf
 Latifa Aliyeva - Mother
 Lala Baghirova - Rimma
 Azhdar Hamidov - Ahmed
 Rafig Aliyev - Komsomol leader
 Arif Kerimov - Murtuzov
 Nizami Musayev - Dunyaminov
 Sadig Huseynov - Retired Colonel
 Tarlan Babayev - Dancer
 Ogtay Suleymanov - Factor worker
 Sahib Guluzade - Head of the Society
 Alla Sannikova - A dwarf lady
 Igor Sannikov - A dwarf man
 Alim Aslanov - Colonel Nazarov
 Dadash Kazimov - Elevator Man
 Faig Babayev - Factory Director

See also
Azerbaijani films of the 1980s

External links 

Soviet comedy-drama films
Soviet-era Azerbaijanian films
Azerbaijani-language films
1989 comedy-drama films
1989 films
Azerbaijanfilm films
1989 comedy films
1989 crime drama films
Azerbaijani comedy-drama films